Wylam is a railway station on the Tyne Valley Line, which runs between  and  via . It is owned by Network Rail and managed by Northern Trains.

History 
The Newcastle and Carlisle Railway was formed in 1829, and was opened in stages.

The station was formerly one of two serving the village, the other being North Wylam on the Scotswood, Newburn and Wylam Railway, which operated between 1876 and 1968. It was situated a short distance from the station at Wylam, at the opposite end of Wylam Bridge.

The station layout is unusual, in that the platforms are not opposite each other. The westbound platform is to the east of the level crossing, alongside the stationmaster's house, whilst the eastbound platform is to the west of the level crossing.

Constructed in 1835, the stationmaster's house is a Grade II* listed building, whilst the footbridge and signal box are both Grade II listed.

Facilities
The station has two platforms, both of which have a ticket machine (which accepts card or contactless payment only), seating, waiting shelter, next train audio and visual displays and an emergency help point. There is step-free access to both platforms, which are linked by level crossing and footbridge. There is a small pay and display car park and cycle storage at the station.

Wylam is part of the Northern Trains penalty fare network, meaning that a valid ticket or promise to pay notice is required prior to boarding the train.

Services

All services are operated by Northern Trains.

Rolling stock used: Class 156 Super Sprinter and Class 158 Express Sprinter

References

External links 
 
 

Grade II* listed railway stations
Grade II* listed buildings in Northumberland
Railway stations in Northumberland
DfT Category F1 stations
Former North Eastern Railway (UK) stations
Railway stations in Great Britain opened in 1835
Railway stations in Great Britain closed in 1966
Railway stations in Great Britain opened in 1967
Northern franchise railway stations
railway station